Barbara Remington (23 June 1929 – 23 January 2020) was an American artist and illustrator.  Born in Minnesota, she was probably best known for her cover-art for Ballantine Books' first paperback editions of J. R. R. Tolkien's novels The Hobbit and The Lord of the Rings  and for her Tolkien-related poster A Map of Middle-earth.

In an interview about her association with Tolkien's works, Remington mentions that she had not been able to get hold of the books before making the illustration, and had only a sketchy idea from friends what they were about. Tolkien, the author, could not understand why her illustration included what he thought were  pumpkins in a tree, or why a lion appeared at all (the lions were removed from the cover of later editions).  Remington became a huge Tolkien fan, and would have "definitely drawn different pictures" had she read the books first.

The popularity of the artwork led to a large edition of the poster as well as work for similar genre fiction such as The Worm Ouroboros by E. R. Eddison.  She also illustrated a number of children's books.

Remington illustrated "Scuttle The Stowaway Mouse", written by Jean and Nancy Soule in 1969. This is a great example of Remington's ability to understand and transform the characters into her own. Her imagination and eye for every small detail is impeccable. Remington illustrated the book “Boat” in 1975. It’s a story told in art (no words). Beautifully drawn with incredible attention to details. All done in pencil and ink. 

Remington  died at her home in Thompson, Pennsylvania,  on January 23, 2020. She was 90 years old.

References

External links
 Interview, on the Tolkien Collector's Guide website
 Brief notes, on the Tolkien Collector's Guide website
 Examples of her work, from a 2005 exhibition

American women illustrators
1929 births
2020 deaths
Tolkien artists
Artists from Minnesota